"Is It Cold In Here" is a song co-written and recorded by American country music singer Joe Diffie that reached the Top Five on the Billboard Hot Country Singles & Tracks (now Hot Country Songs) chart. It was released in December 1991 as the first single from his album Regular Joe.  The song was written by Diffie, Kerry Kurt Phillips and Danny Morrison.

Chart performance
The song debuted at number 65 on the Hot Country Singles & Tracks chart dated December 7, 1991. It charted for 20 weeks on that chart, reaching its peak of number 5 on the country chart dated February 21, 1992.

Charts

Year-end charts

References

1991 singles
Joe Diffie songs
Songs written by Joe Diffie
Songs written by Danny Morrison (songwriter)
Songs written by Kerry Kurt Phillips
Song recordings produced by Bob Montgomery (songwriter)
Epic Records singles
1991 songs